von Stade is a surname. Notable people with the surname include:

Albert von Stade (b. ca. 1187), German Medieval friar, author of a chronicle and a Latin epic on the Trojan War
Francis Skiddy von Stade, Sr. (1884–1967), American polo player, father of Charles von Stade
Charles S. von Stade (1919–1945), American polo champion, father of opera singer Frederica von Stade
Frederica von Stade (b. 1945), American mezzo-soprano